The 1985 North Rhine-Westphalia state election was held on 12 May 1985 to elect the 10th Landtag of North Rhine-Westphalia. The outgoing government was a majority of the Social Democratic Party (SPD), led by Minister-President Johannes Rau.

The SPD won re-election in a landslide, recording their best-ever result with 52.1% of votes. The opposition Christian Democratic Union (CDU) suffered their worst result up until this point with 36.5%. The SPD's victory came despite an increase in support for minor parties: the Free Democratic Party (FDP) returned to the Landtag with 6% and 14 seats, while The Greens narrowly fell short with 4.6% of votes. The magnitude of the SPD's victory saw them win 125 of the 151 single-member constituencies, resulting in a number of leveling seats being added to ensure proportionality, boosting the Landtag to 227 seats.

Electoral system
The Landtag was elected via mixed-member proportional representation. 151 members were elected in single-member constituencies via first-past-the-post voting, and fifty then allocated using compensatory proportional representation. A single ballot was used for both. The minimum size of the Landtag was 201 members, but if overhang seats were present, proportional leveling seats were added to ensure proportionality. An electoral threshold of 5% of valid votes is applied to the Landtag; parties that fall below this threshold are ineligible to receive seats.

Background

In the previous election held on 11 May 1980, the SPD recorded a clear victory, winning an outright majority in the Landtag with 48.4% of votes while the CDU declined to 43.2%. The FDP fell narrowly short of the 5% threshold and lost their seats. The SPD formed government alone and Johannes Rau continued as Minister-President.

Parties
The table below lists parties represented in the 9th Landtag of North Rhine-Westphalia.

Results

External links

References

Elections in North Rhine-Westphalia